is the fourth-largest lake in Japan, located in central Fukushima Prefecture, south of Mount Bandai. The lake is located within the borders of Bandai-Asahi National Park. In winter swans migrate to the beaches of the lake and stay there until spring.

History 
Lake Inawashiro was formed some 30–40,000 years ago when a tectonic depression was dammed by a major eruption and pyroclastic flow from Mount Bandai. The water is acidic with a pH value of approximately 5.0, and has a high degree of transparency. The water level was considerably less during the Jōmon period as numerous artifacts and ceramic fragments have been found offshore.

The lake water is an important source for irrigation in the Aizu region of western Fukushima Prefecture. An irrigation canal was completed during the Edo period and another, the Asaka Canal,  in 1882. A third canal completed in 1915 supplies the city of Kōriyama with drinking and industrial water.  The water also supplies a number of hydroelectric power plants. The lake is also an important tourist and leisure attraction in Fukushima Prefecture.

Notes

References

World Lake Database

See also 
Hideyo Noguchi
Mount Bandai

External links 
Inawashiro Tourist Accosiation
Lake Inawashiro(Japanese travel guide)
Lake Inawashiro(visit AIZU)

Inawashiro
Tourist attractions in Fukushima Prefecture
Lake Inawashiro
Landforms of Fukushima Prefecture
Inawashiro, Fukushima
Aizuwakamatsu
Kōriyama
Inawashiro